Home Is a Strange Place is a mini album by the American grunge band Paw. It was released on August 22, 2000, through Koch International. The album is currently out of print. Paw disbanded shortly after the album's release. No singles were released from the album.

Musically, the album incorporated a more pronounced "stripped-down" blues element than the band's previous works.

Track listing
"Ruby Red" – 1:27
"One Handed in the Red Room" – 4:02
"Blow Wind" – 4:08
"Into the Woods" (G. Fitch) – 4:30
"Naiad" (G. Fitch) – 5:35
"Home Is a Strange Place" – 5:49
"Oily Rags" (G. Fitch) – 2:56
All songs were written by Mark Hennessy and Grant Fitch, except where noted.

Personnel
Mark Hennessy - Vocals
Grant Fitch - Guitars, Vocals
Peter Fitch - Drums, Percussion
J. Hall - Drums (Track 4)
Steve Henry - Lead guitar (Tracks 5 and 6)
Dan Hines - Bass
Jason Magierowski - Bass (Track 4)

References

Paw (band) albums
2000 albums